Asmahur-e Olya (also Romanized as Asmāhūr-e ‘Olyā, Esmahoor Olya, and Esmāhūr-e ‘Olyā; also known as Asmāhūr-e Bālā and Esmāhūr Bālā) is a village in Borborud-e Sharqi Rural District, in the Central District of Aligudarz County, Lorestan Province, Iran. At the 2006 census, its population was 305, in 68 families.

References 

Towns and villages in Aligudarz County